Bruceiella globulus is a species of sea snail, a marine gastropod mollusk in the family Skeneidae.

Distribution
This marine species occurs off the Fiji Islands.

References

 A Waren, P Bouchet, New records, species, genera, and a new family of gastropods from hydrothermal vents and hydrocarbon seeps; Zoologica Scripta, 1993 vol. 22 issue 1 - Wiley Online Library

External links
 To Biodiversity Heritage Library (1 publication)
 To Encyclopedia of Life
 To GenBank (2 nucleotides; 2 proteins)
 To World Register of Marine Species

globulus
Gastropods described in 1993